An election to Dublin Corporation took place on Thursday 15 January 1914 as part of that year's Irish local elections.

Prior to the election Dublin had been the scene of a major industrial dispute in the form of the Dublin Lock-out, and the election saw the newly created Labour Party emerge as the councils second party. One council seat was left vacant.

Council composition following election

Ward results

Arran Quay

Alderman

Councillor

Clontarf East

Alderman

Councillor

Clontarf West

Alderman

Councillor

Drumcondra

Alderman

Councillor

Fitzwilliam Ward

Councillor

Glasnevin

Alderman

Councillor

Inn's Quay

Alderman

Councillor

Merchant's Quay

Alderman

Councillor

Mountjoy Ward

Alderman

Councillor

New Kilmainham

Councillor
The ward was previously held by Thomas O'Hanlon, a Labour member, however O'Hanlon was unable to be nominated due to not appearing on the electoral register.

North City

Alderman

Councillor

North Dock

Alderman

Councillor

Rotunda

Alderman

Councillor

South City Ward

Councillor

South Dock

Councillor

Trinity

Councillor

Usher's Quay

Councillor

Wood Quay Ward

Councillor

References

1914 Irish local elections
1914